Madhukar Sarpotdar (1936-2010) was a leader of Shiv Sena and a member of Lok Sabha elected from Mumbai North West. He was trade unionist and a member of  Maharashtra Legislative Assembly elected in 1990.

References

Shiv Sena politicians
Maharashtra MLAs 1990–1995
India MPs 1998–1999
India MPs 1996–1997
Trade unionists from Maharashtra
Politicians from Mumbai
Lok Sabha members from Maharashtra
1936 births
2010 deaths
Members of the Maharashtra Legislative Council
Marathi politicians